The Moradi Formation is a geological formation in Niger. It is of Late Permian age. It is informally divided into three subunits. The lower portion of the formation consists of red mudstone, with muddy calcareous sandstone and quartz-granlule conglomerate present as lenses. The middle portion consists of muddy siltstone in thick beds interbedded with red argillaceous sandstone. The lower two thirds of the upper portion of the formation consist of red siltstone intercalated with channel lag intraformational conglomerates, while the upper third consists of barchanoid shaped lenses of conglomeratic sandstone with ventifacts.

Fossil content 
The formation is known for its fossils, including the temnospondyls Nigerpeton and Saharastega, the pareiasaur Bunostegos, the captorhinid Moradisaurus, as well as a large indeterminate gorgonopsid. Dicynodonts, widespread in other contemporary deposits, appear to be absent, with previous reports being in error. The flora of the formation includes indeterminate voltzian conifers.

References 

Geologic formations of Niger
Permian System of Africa
Changhsingian
Conglomerate formations
Mudstone formations
Sandstone formations
Shale formations
Fluvial deposits
Ichnofossiliferous formations
Permian southern paleotemperate deposits
Paleontology in Niger